Balo-i, officially the Municipality of Baloi (Maranao: Inged a Balo-i;), is a 3rd class municipality in the province of Lanao del Norte, Philippines. According to the 2020 census, it has a population of 68,465 people.

It is also spelled Baloi, or Balëy using Filipino 2014 Orthography.

Balo-i is the town where the Maria Cristina Airport, also known as Iligan Airport, is located.

History
The town was created from the municipal districts of Momungan, Pantar, and Balut (August 1, 1948). It is the mother town of Tagoloan (June 21, 1969) and Pantar (June 11, 1978).

Geography

Barangays
Balo-i is politically subdivided into 21 barangays.

Climate

Demographics

Economy 

Crops
 vegetables
 camote (the largest camote in the province)
 corn
 pakal
 squash
 watermelon
 madang
 durian
 coconut
 peanut
 sweet potato

Delicacies
 rotie (a pancake that is made by a flour mixed with chicken curry flavor)
 dodol (a rice grind cooked with durian flavor)
 bakas (a tuna cooked through a smoke)
 sweet delicacies such as tiyateg, berowa, amik, and tamokonsi.

Infrastructure
It is the home of the Agus IV Hydroelectric Powerplant (Located in Barangay Nangka; 18 kilometers from Iligan City) on the Agus River. It is said to be sufficient to light a city more than 12 times the size of Iligan City or to run 20 cement factories.

Education

Colleges and universities
 Philippine Science High School Central Mindanao Campus
 MSU Balo-i Community College, former MSU Balo-i Pilot High School now a college institution which offers three Bachelor of Science degrees (Agricultural Technology, Forestry Technology, and Information Technology).
 WestEastern Philippine College,Inc., located in Zapacan, Balo-I Lanao del Norte, offers Kinder to Grade 6 and Junior High School,  as well as Senior High School. Please visit the Facebook Account: WestEastern Philippine College, Inc. 
 IBN Mas-Od Integrated School, located in Barangay East Poblacion, offers integrated elementary education with Arabic education.
 Momungan Academy, located in Barangay Pacalundo.

Public schools

Baloi West District:
Baloi Central School
Momungan Elementary School
Pacalundo Elementary School
Dadoan elementary School
Bangko Elementary School
Balut Primary School
 Matampay Primary School
 Baloi National High School

Baloi East District:
Maria Cristina Central School
Nangka elementary School
Datu Timbul Ali Elementary School
Sigayan Primary School
Abaga Elementary School
Pendulunan Elementary School

References

External links
 Baloi Profile at the DTI Cities and Municipalities Competitive Index
 [ Philippine Standard Geographic Code]
 
 Philippine Census Information
Local Governance Performance Management System

Municipalities of Lanao del Norte